Brian Molloy may refer to:

 Brian Molloy (botanist) (born 1930), New Zealand plant ecologist, conservationist, and former New Zealand All Blacks rugby union player
 Brian Molloy (Irish republican), member of the Irish Republican Army, fl. 1916-1921
 Brian Molloy (hurler) (born 1995), Irish hurler